The spat (symbol sp), from the Latin spatium ("space"), is a unit of solid angle. 1 spat is equal to 4 steradians or approximately  square degrees of solid angle . Thus it is the solid angle subtended by a complete sphere at its center.

See also
 Turn (angle) — the plane angle counterpart of the spat, equivalent to 2 radians

References

Units of solid angle